Étienne Bauny (1564, Mouzon, Ardennes, France – 3 December 1649, Saint Pol de Léon) was a French Jesuit theologian.

Life
He was admitted into the Society of Jesus, 20 July 1593, and after teaching humanities and rhetoric he was promoted to the chair of moral theology which he occupied for sixteen years. He was for a time superior of the Jesuit residence at Pontoise. He had the confidence of the most distinguished prelates of his age, especially of Cardinal François de La Rochefoucauld, who chose him as his spiritual director, and of René de Rieux, Bishop of Léon, who entrusted to him the settlement of the most delicate affairs of his episcopate.

Bauny's knowledge of moral theology was profound, but he was in many points too lenient. His indulgence excited the indignation of the Jansenists, and it was to him that Blaise Pascal, Arnauld and others turned, when they accused the Society of Jesus of teaching lax morality. He is criticised severely in Pascal's Provincial Letters.

He was a man of extraordinary severity towards himself, a skilful guide of souls, full of charity towards sinners, prudent in the management of affairs. He died in the odour of sanctity, almost in the very exercise of his apostolic ministry, at the age of eighty-five.

Works 
His published works are:

"Constitutiones Synodales dioecesis Leonensis, a Renato de Rieux Episcopo Leonensi promulgatae Paulipoli in Leoniâ" (Paris, 1630)
"Pratique du droit canonique au gouvernement de l'Eglise, correction des moeurs, et distribution des bénéfices, le tout au style et usage de France" (Paris, 1634)
"De Sacramentis ac Personis Sacris, earumque dignitate, obligationibus ac jure, juxta sacrarum litterarum testimonia, SS. Patrum sententias Canonum ac Conciliorum sanctiones, cum summariis, indice duplice, uno tractatuum et quaestionum, rerum altero. Theologiae moralis pars prima" (Paris, 1640) in fol.
"Tractatus de censuris ecclesiasticis" (Paris, 1642), in fol.
"Nova beneficiorum praxisæ" (Paris, 1649).

The second and third of these works are on the Index.

References

Franklin, J., The Science of Conjecture: Evidence and Probability Before Pascal (Baltimore: Johns Hopkins University Press, 2001), 97–98, 288.
Guilhermy, Menologe de la c. de J., Assistance de France, II, 559
Hugo von Hurter, Nomenclator, I, 494
 Sommervogel, Bibliothèque de la c. de J., I, col. 1058.

1564 births
1649 deaths
Catholic casuists
17th-century French Catholic theologians
17th-century French Jesuits